is the second single by the Japanese pop group ZYX. It was released on December 10, 2003, and reached number 11 on the Oricon charts.

CD track list 
Shiroi Tokyo
 (Coconuts Musume cover)
Shiroi Tokyo (Instrumental)

Single V track list 
Shiroi Tokyo 
Shiroi Tokyo (close-up version)
Making of

Song information 

Lyrics & music: Tsunku
Arrangement: Shoichiro Hirata
Chorus: Hiroaki Takeuchi and Tsunku
Vocals:
Main vocals: Megumi Murakami
Center vocals: Mari Yaguchi, Erika Umeda, and Megumi Murakami
Minor vocals: Saki Shimizu, Maimi Yajima, and Momoko Tsugunaga

External links
 Hello! Project discography

2003 singles